was a Japanese idol group, consisting of six girls. It was dissolved on July 3, 2016.

Members 
See also: "Otome Shinto", § "Members" in the Japanese Wikipedia.

Final lineup

Former members

Timeline

Discography

Singles

Digital singles 
  (by the subunit )

Albums

DVDs

References

External links 
 Official website (archived on July 11, 2016)

Japanese idol groups
Japanese girl groups
Japanese vocal groups
Musical groups established in 2012
Musical groups disestablished in 2016
2012 establishments in Japan
2016 disestablishments in Japan